Radium Hot Springs Airport  is an airport located adjacent to Radium Hot Springs, British Columbia, Canada.

References

Registered aerodromes in British Columbia
Regional District of East Kootenay